Still Life Paintings from the Netherlands 1550–1720, (Dutch:Het Nederlandse Stilleven 1550–1720) is a 1999 art exhibition catalog published for a jointly held exhibition by the Rijksmuseum Amsterdam (19 June – 9 September 1999) and Cleveland Museum of Art (31 October 1999 – 9 January 2000). The catalog included detailed discussions of 80 paintings from various collection holders, that together give an overview of the best genres in Dutch still-life paintings, namely kitchen piece (keukenstuk), fruit still-life, (fruitstuk), floral still-life (blommetje), breakfast piece (ontbijtje), vanitas, hunting piece (jaagstuk), and show piece (pronkstilleven). The catalog was organized by type, but also loosely by time period, starting with the earliest works.

Sources
 Still Life Paintings from the Netherlands 1550–1720, (Dutch:Het Nederlandse Stilleven 1550–1720), by Alan Chong, W. Th Kloek, Celeste Brusati, Exhibition catalog Rijksmuseum Amsterdam and Cleveland Museum of Art, Zwolle, Waanders, 1999

Rijksmuseum Amsterdam
Museums in Cleveland
Lists of paintings
Art exhibitions in the Netherlands
Art exhibitions in the United States